MDI may refer to:

Computer science
Media Delivery Index, a metric used in IPTV networks
Medium-dependent interface (MDI) and medium-dependent interface crossover (MDI-X), types of Ethernet port connections
Microsoft Document Imaging Format, a proprietary file format
Mission Data Interface, an interface developed by NUWC Keyport
Multiple-document interface, a type of software application interface
Multi-Draw Indirect, a Rendering technique

Health
Major Depression Inventory, a self-report mood inventory developed by the World Health Organization
Metered-dose inhaler, a device that helps deliver a specific amount of medication to the lungs
Multiple drug intake, an unnatural cause of death
Multiple Daily Injections, a technique of intensive insulinotherapy
Mental Development Index, a measure of the cognitive abilities of infants and part of the Bayley Scales of Infant Development

Organizations
Management Development Institute, a business school in Gurgaon, India
Men's Divisions International, a non-profit men's organization in North America
Merchants Distributors, Inc., a wholesale grocery store distributor based in Hickory, North Carolina
Movement for Democracy and Independence, a former political party in the Central African Republic
Motor Development International, a compressed air car maker

Other uses
Mount Desert Island, an island off the coast of the U.S. state of Maine
Methylene diphenyl diisocyanate, a chemical
Michelson Doppler Imager, an instrument on board the SOHO spacecraft
1501, in Roman numerals
Medically determinable impairment, a factor in establishing disability under Social Security Disability Insurance and Supplemental Security Income

See also
MD1 Ministry of Defence 1, a British weapon research and development organisation of the Second World War